Abdin Mohamed Ali Salih FAAS FTWAS FIWRA (born 1944) is a Sudanese Civil Engineering Professor at the University of Khartoum and a UNESCO expert in Water Resources.

Early life and education 
Salih was born in Wad Madani, Sudan in 1944. Salih joined the University of Khartoum in 1963 and obtained a Bachelor of Science with a First Class Honors in Civil Engineering in 1969. He then received a Diploma of Imperial College and continued to complete a Doctor of Philosophy in Hydraulics in 1972 from Imperial College London. He later obtained a Diploma in Hydrology from the University of Padua, Italy, in 1974.

Research and career 
After his PhD, Salih returned to Sudan in 1973 and joined the Faculty of Engineering of the University of Khartoum as a Lecturer before becoming an associate professor in 1977, a head of the department of Civil Engineering in 1979, and a full professor in 1982. He became the University of Khartoum's Deputy Vice-Chancellor between 1990 and 1991. As of November 2022, he is a professor at the Department of Civil Engineering, University of Khartoum, and a member of the Governing Councils of the University of Khartoum and Sudan University of Science and Technology. He was also a professor at the College of Engineering, King Saud University, from 1982 until.

Salih's research and consulting work focuses on water security and water resources management. He served at the UNESCO from 1993 until he became a Director of the Division of Water Sciences in 2011, and was a member of the Executive Board of UNESCO from 2015 until 2019. He was also the alternate Governor of the World Water Council between 1999 and 2003. Salih works as an advisor for the High Commission for the Development of Riyadh, Saudi Arabia, he is a member of many international water societies, and has been a jury member of many international water prizes.

Awards and honours 
Salih was elected as a Fellow of the International Water Resources Association (FIWRA) in 1983, a Fellow of the African Academy of Sciences (FAAS) in 1993, and a Fellow of The Word Academy of Sciences (FTWAS) in 2002.

He was award Islamic World Educational, Scientific and Cultural Organization (ISESCO)’s Award for Excellence in Scientific Research.

Personal life 
Salih is married with three children.

Selected publications 

 Abdin M. A Salih, Uygur Sendil (1984-09-01). Evapotranspiration under Extremely Arid Climates. Journal of Irrigation and Drainage Engineering. 110 (3): 289–303. doi:10.1061/(ASCE)0733-9437(1984)110:3(289). ISSN 0733-9437.
 Solaiman A. Al‐Sha'lan, Abdin M. A. Salih (1987-11-01). Evapotranspiration Estimates in Extremely Arid Areas. Journal of Irrigation and Drainage Engineering. 113 (4): 565–574. doi:10.1061/(ASCE)0733-9437(1987)113:4(565). ISSN 0733-9437.
 Abdin M. A. Salih, Ibrahim, Nagwa (1998-12-15). UNESCO's international hydrological program and sustainable water resources management in the Arab region. Desalination. Selected papers presented at The Third Gulf Water Conference Towards Efficient Utilization of Water Resources in the Gulf Water Science and Technology Association (WSTA). 120 (1): 15–22. doi:10.1016/S0011-9164(98)00197-0. ISSN 0011-9164.
 Abdin M. A. Salih (1980-10-01). Entrained Air in Linearly Accelerated Water Flow. Journal of the Hydraulics Division. 106 (10): 1595–1605. doi:10.1061/JYCEAJ.0005531.
 Abdin M. A. Salih (1985-01-01). The Nile Inside the Sudan—Increasing Demands and Their Consequences. Water International. 10 (2): 73–78. doi:10.1080/02508068508686311. ISSN 0250-8060.

Notes

See also
 Elfatih Eltahir
 Yahia Abdel Mageed

References

External links 

 

Fellows of the African Academy of Sciences
Sudanese scientists
Living people
UNESCO officials
TWAS fellows
1944 births
Sudanese people
Alumni of Imperial College London
University of Khartoum alumni
Academic staff of the University of Khartoum